Skyline Airways Pvt. Ltd. was an airline based in Kathmandu, Nepal. It was operational between 1999 and 2006 and provided scheduled services to rural destinations in Nepal, as well as charter flights.

History 
Skyline Airways launched revenue operations on 15 July 1999, with a fleet of two de Havilland Canada DHC-6 Twin Otter.

Destinations 
Skyline Airways regularly served the following destinations, which were cancelled either at the closure of operations or before:

Fleet 
At the time of closure, Skyline Airways operated the following aircraft:

Former fleet

Accidents and incidents
25 December 1999 - A Skyline Airways De Havilland Canada DHC-6 Twin Otter 300 (9N-AFL) crashed 5 minutes after take off from Simara Airport on a flight to Kathmandu. All three crew and seven passengers were killed.
17 July 2002 - A Skyline Airways De Havilland Canada DHC-6 Twin Otter 300 (9N-AGF) left Jumla on a flight to Surkhet. The aircraft reached an altitude of about 6500 feet around 18 minutes after take-off and before crashing into trees on the Gargare Danda hill in bad weather, 10 km north of Surkhet. All four people on board were killed, including two crew and two passengers.

Notes

References

External links 

  (Archived company web site)

Defunct airlines of Nepal
Airlines established in 1998
Airlines disestablished in 2003
1999 establishments in Nepal
2006 disestablishments in Nepal